This is a list of San Francisco Dons football players in the NFL Draft.

Key

Selections

References

San Francisco

San Francisco Dons NFL Draft